Sainte-Veronique Water Aerodrome  is located adjacent to Sainte-Veronique, Quebec, Canada.

References

Registered aerodromes in Laurentides
Seaplane bases in Quebec